The 2012 European Junior Swimming Championships were held from 4–8 July 2012 in Antwerp, Belgium. The Championships were organized by LEN, the European Swimming League, and were held in a 50-meter pool. Per LEN rules, competitors have age 15 or 16 for girls and 17 or 18 for boys.

Results

Boys

Girls

Medal table

Participating countries 
43 countries will take part in 2011 European Junior Swimming Championships with total of 486 swimmers.

References

External links 
Official website

2012 in swimming
European Junior Swimming
European Junior Swimming Championships
Swimming competitions in Belgium
Sports competitions in Antwerp
International aquatics competitions hosted by Belgium
2010s in Antwerp
July 2012 sports events in Europe
Swimming